The 2011 FIS Freestyle World Ski Championships  were held at Deer Valley Resort, together with Park City Mountain Resort. The 2011 FIS Freestyle World Championships took place from January 30 until February 7, 2011, and included aerials, moguls, dual moguls and ski cross competitions at Deer Valley Resort and the slopestyle and ski halfpipe competitions at Park City Mountain Resort. Deer Valley previously held the World Championships in 2003.

Results

Men's events

Women's events

Medal table

Participating nations 
313 athletes representing 36 countries competed. The British Virgin Islands made its debut.

  (1)
 
 
 
 
 
 
  (1)
  (39)
 
 
 
 
 
 
 
 
 
 
 
 
 
 
 
 
 
 
 
 
 
 
 
 (8)
 
  (37)

External links 
 Official website 
 FIS Freestyle Skiing

References 

 
2011
FIS Snowboarding World Championships
Freestyle World Ski Championships
FIS Snowboarding World Championships 2011
Freestyle skiing competitions in the United States
2011 in sports in Utah